The Expressway Stakes is an Australian Turf Club Group 2 Thoroughbred open horse race for three-year-olds and older, run under Weight for Age conditions over a distance of 1200 metres at Rosehill Racecourse, Sydney, Australia in late January or early February. Prizemoney is A$200,000.

History

Distance
1974–1979 – 1100 metres
1980–1997 – 1200 metres 
 1998 – 1100 metres
 1999 – 1300 metres
2000–2003  – 1200 metres 
 2004 – 1180 metres
 2005 onwards - 1200 metres

Grade
 1974– 1978 - Principal race
1979 onwards - Group 2

Venue
 1974–1982 - Randwick Racecourse
 1983 - Warwick Farm Racecourse
 1984 - Randwick Racecourse
 1985–1986 - Warwick Farm Racecourse
 1987  - Randwick Racecourse
 1988–1991 - Warwick Farm Racecourse
 1992–2001 - Randwick Racecourse
 2002 - Warwick Farm Racecourse
 2003–2005 - Randwick Racecourse
2006–2007 - Rosehill Racecourse
 2008 - Canterbury Park Racecourse
2009–2012 - Rosehill Racecourse
 2013 - Warwick Farm Racecourse
 2014 - Randwick Racecourse
 2015–2019 - Rosehill Racecourse
 2020 - Randwick Racecourse
 2021 onwards - Rosehill Racecourse

Winners

 2022 - Overpass
 2021 - Savatiano
 2020 - Standout
 2019 - Alizee
 2018 - Trapeze Artist
 2017 - Music Magnate 
 2016 - Our Boy Malachi
 2015 - Weary
 2014 - Appearance
 2013 - Happy Galaxy
 2012 - Rain Affair
 2011 - Centennial Park
 2010 - Rangirangdoo
 2009 - Burdekin Blues
 2008 - Paratroopers
 2007 - Mentality
 2006 - Court's In Session
 2005 - Court's In Session
 2004 - Sportsman
 2003 - Lonhro
 2002 - Ateates
 2001 - Tie The Knot
 2000 - Mr. Innocent
 1999 - Kidman's Cove
 1998 - Hockney
 1997 - Cangronde
 1996 - Saintly
 1995 - Moss Rocket
 1994 - Soho Square
 1993 - Let's Hurry
 1992 - Joanne
 1991 - Potrero
 1990 - race not held
 1989 - Groucho
 1988 - At Sea
 1987 - Diamond Shower
 1986 - Avon Angel
 1985 - Royal Troubador
 1984 - Sir Dapper
 1983 - Sheraco
 1982 - Trench Digger
 1981 - Goreham
 1980 - Kingston Town
 1979 - Joy Love
 1978 - Luskin Star
 1977 - Red Ruffian
 1976 - Avellino
 1975 - Zephyr Bay
 1974 - I'm Scarlet

See also
 List of Australian Group races
 Group races

References

Horse races in Australia